Abbaludu  is a village in the southern state of Karnataka, India located in the Sidlaghatta taluk of Chikkaballapura district (formerly Kolar district).

References

Villages in Chikkaballapur district